The women's event of the 2012 Masters Grand Slam of Curling was held from November 14 to 18 at the Wayne Gretzky Sports Centre, the Brantford Golf & Curling Club, and the Paris Curling Club in Brantford and Paris, Ontario as part of the 2012–13 World Curling Tour. The majority of the women's Tier I round robin games was held at the Brantford Golf & Curling Club, while the remainder of the Tier I games and the playoffs round games were held at the Wayne Gretzky Sports Centre. The women's Tier II games were held at the Paris Curling Club, and the women's Tier II playoffs qualifiers were held at the Brantford Golf & Curling Club. It was held as the fourth Grand Slam on the women's tour.

In the final, Rachel Homan of Ontario defeated Chelsea Carey of Manitoba with a score of 8–3.

The event is split up into two tiers, with 18 teams in Tier I and 16 teams in Tier II. The Tier I teams were divided into 3 pools of 6 teams which played in a round robin, while the Tier II teams played off in a triple knockout event. 8 Tier II teams qualified for a playoff to determine which two teams would enter the playoffs along with six Tier I teams.

Tier I

Teams
The teams are listed as follows:

Round Robin Standings
Final Round Robin Standings

Round robin results
All draw times are listed in Eastern Standard Time.

Draw 1
Thursday, November 15, 9:00

Draw 2
Thursday, November 15, 12:30

Draw 3
Thursday, November 15, 16:00

Draw 4
Thursday, November 15, 19:30

Draw 5
Friday, November 16, 8:30

Draw 6
Friday, November 16, 12:00

Draw 7
Friday, November 16, 15:30

Draw 8
Friday, November 16, 19:00

Tiebreakers
Saturday, November 17, 8:30

Tier II

Teams
The teams are listed as follows:

Knockout Draw Brackets
The draw is listed as follows:

A event

B event

C event

Knockout results
All draw times are listed in Eastern Standard Time.

Draw 1
Thursday, November 14, 8:30

Draw 2
Thursday, November 14, 11:30

Draw 3
Thursday, November 14, 14:30

Draw 4
Thursday, November 14, 17:30

Draw 5
Thursday, November 14, 20:30

Draw 6
Friday, November 15, 8:30

Draw 7
Friday, November 15, 12:30

Draw 8
Friday, November 15, 16:30

Draw 9
Friday, November 15, 20:30

Playoffs qualifiers

Results
Saturday, November 16, 8:30

Saturday, November 16, 12:00

Playoffs

Quarterfinals
Saturday, November 17, 15:30

Saturday, November 17, 19:30

Semifinals
Sunday, November 18, 8:00

Final
Sunday, November 18, 13:00

References

External links

2012 in women's curling